The following is a timeline of the history of the city of Benghazi, Libya.

Prior to 20th century

 7th century BCE - Euesperides founded by Cyrenians near site of present-day Benghazi.
 1517 CE - Cyrenaica becomes part of Ottoman Tripolitania.
 1577 - Atiq Mosque built.
 1820 - Alhadadp Mosque founded.(ar)
 1827 - British consulate established.
 1858 - Plague outbreak.
 1869 - Administrative Benghazi mutessariflik (province) created.
 1874 - Plague outbreak.
 1895
  built in Al-Berka.
 Italian "Società d'Esplorazione Commerciale in Africa" active in Benghazi.

20th century

1900s-1940s
 1906 -  burns down.
 1911
 19 October: Town occupied by Italian forces during the Italo-Turkish War.
 Population: 35,000.
 1913 - Albergo Italia (hotel) built.
 1914 -  begins operating.
 1916 -  built.
 1922 - Benghazi Lighthouse built.
 1924 - City Hall built.
 1926 -  begins operating.
 1927
  begins operating.
 Catholic Apostolic Vicariate of Cyrenaica established.
 1928 -  opens.
 1931 - September: Trial of Omar Mukhtar, leading to his execution on 16 September in nearby Suluq.
 1934
 Pier built in the Port of Benghazi.
 Administrative Benghazi Province created.
 1936 -  built.
 1937 - March: Mussolini visits Benghazi.
 1939 - Benghazi Cathedral built.
 1942
 November: British forces take city during the Battle of El Agheila in World War II.
 Italian rule ends.
 Omar al-Mukhtar Society formed.
 1945 - Population: 60,000 (approximate).
 1947 - Ahly Benghazi football club active.

1950s-1990s
 1952
 Al-Hilal SC (sport club) formed.
 University of Oxford's Ashmolean Expedition to Cyrenaica begins its archaeological excavation of Euesperides site.
 1953 - City boundary established.
 1954 - Al Tahaddy SC (football club) formed.
 1955 - University of Libya founded.
 1956 - Benghazi Zoo founded.
 1957 - Benghazi Military University Academy established.
 1964 - Population: 137,295.
 1967 - Stadium and Suliman Ad-Dharrath Arena open.
 1970s - Giuliana Bridge opens.
 1973
 University of Benghazi active.
 Population: 266,000.
 1980 - February: Protest at French consulate.
 1982
 March: Part of 1982 African Cup of Nations football contest held in Benghazi.
  built.
 1984 - Population: 442,860.
 1986 - 15 April: Aerial bombing of city by United States forces.
 1989 - Tibesti Hotel (hi-rise) built.
 1990 - Population: 800,000 (estimate).
 1991 - "Administrative Office Complex" (hi-rise) built.
 1993 - September: Great Man-Made River constructed; water begins flowing to Benghazi.
 2000
 1 September: Al-Ahly football stadium demolished.
 September: Unrest.

21st century

 2005 - Population: 685,367 (estimate).
 2006 - 15 February: Protest against Muhammad cartoons.
 2007 - Quryna newspaper begins publication.
 2008 -  construction begins.
 2009 - Martyrs of February Stadium opens in nearby Benina.
 2011
 15 February: Arab Spring-related protest; Libyan Civil War (2011) begins.
 Al Kalima newspaper begins publication.
 2012
 19 May: Local election held.
 June: "Pro-autonomy mob ransacks the election commission building."
 September: United States consulate attacked.
 2014
 16 May: Benina International Airport closes due to fighting.
 15 October: Battle of Benghazi begins.
 2017
 18 April: Abdelrahman Alabbar becomes mayor.
 15 July: Benina Airport reopens.
 27 July: Battle of Benghazi officially concludes.

See also
 History of Benghazi
 Timeline of Tripoli, Libya

Notes

References

This article incorporates information from the Arabic Wikipedia, German Wikipedia, and Italian Wikipedia.

Bibliography

 
 
 
 
 
  (Includes information about Benghazi)

External links

   (Bibliography of open access  articles)
 Items related to Benghazi, various dates (via Europeana)
 Items related to Benghazi, various dates (via Digital Public Library of America)
  (Bibliography)

Images

History of Benghazi
Benghazi
Years in Libya
Libya history-related lists